The Shadow Laughs is a 1933 American Pre-Code mystery film directed by Arthur Hoerl and starring Hal Skelly, Rose Hobart and Harry T. Morey.

Cast
 Hal Skelly as Robin Dale  
 Rose Hobart as Ruth Hackett  
 Harry T. Morey as Capt. Morgan 
 Walter Fenner as Tennant  
 Robert Keith as George Hackett  
 Geoffrey Bryant as Ryan  
 Harry Short as Clymer
 John F. Morrissey as Sgt. Owens  
 Cesar Romero as Tony Rico

References

Bibliography
 Weaver, Tom. Double Feature Creature Attack: A Monster Merger of Two More Volumes of Classic Interviews. McFarland, 2003.

External links
 

1933 films
1933 mystery films
American mystery films
Films directed by Arthur Hoerl
American black-and-white films
1930s English-language films
1930s American films